Tom Mitchell (born 22 July 1989) is an English rugby union player.

Biography 
Mitchell attended leading Worth School in West Sussex and represents England in rugby sevens and won a silver medal representing Great Britain in the 2016 Summer Olympics; he is also the captain for both teams. He debuted for England at the 2012 Wellington Sevens.

Mitchell was the leading scorer in the 2013-14 World Series, with 358 points, helping England to a fourth-place finish in the Series that year. He was one of four nominees for the 2014 World Rugby Sevens Player of the Year award, but the award was captured by Fiji's Samisoni Viriviri, the leading try scorer on the Series that year.

In 2015 he fractured his leg and dislocated his ankle during the 2014–15 Sevens World Series. He was injured during the 2014 Commonwealth Games in a match against Australia. Earlier in his career, while doing a course in Historical Studies at Kellogg College, Oxford, He played for Oxford University, scoring a try in their victory over Cambridge in the 2011 Varsity Match.

Mitchell competed for England at the 2022 Rugby World Cup Sevens in Cape Town.

References

External links
 England Profile
 
 
 
 
 

1989 births
Living people
Alumni of Kellogg College, Oxford
Commonwealth Games bronze medallists for England
Commonwealth Games medallists in rugby sevens
Commonwealth Games rugby sevens players of England
England international rugby sevens players
English rugby union players
Great Britain national rugby sevens team players
Male rugby sevens players
Medalists at the 2016 Summer Olympics
Olympic medalists in rugby sevens
Olympic rugby sevens players of Great Britain
Olympic silver medallists for Great Britain
Oxford University RFC players
People from Cuckfield
Rugby sevens players at the 2014 Commonwealth Games
Rugby sevens players at the 2016 Summer Olympics
Rugby sevens players at the 2020 Summer Olympics
Rugby union players from Cuckfield
Rugby union fullbacks
Rugby union wings
Rugby union centres
Harlequin F.C. players
LA Giltinis players
Medallists at the 2018 Commonwealth Games